Chrysopeleia purpuriella is a moth that belongs to family Cosmopterigidae and to the superfamily Gelechioidea. It was described by Vactor Tousey Chambers in 1874. It is found in North America, where it has been recorded from Arkansas, Illinois, Kentucky, New York and Ohio.

References

Arctiidae genus list at Butterflies and Moths of the World of the Natural History Museum

Moths described in 1874
Chrysopeleiinae